Suola may refer to:

Suola (river), Sakha Republic, Russia

Rural localities
Suola, Meldekhsinsky Rural Okrug, Megino-Kangalassky District, Sakha Republic, a selo in Meldekhsinsky Rural Okrug
Suola, Moruksky Rural Okrug, Megino-Kangalassky District, Sakha Republic, a selo in Moruksky Rural Okrug